Alexei Semenov may refer to:
 Alexei Semenov (mathematician) (born 1950) is a Russian mathematician
 Alexei Semenov (ice hockey) (born 1981) is a Russian former professional ice hockey defenceman